Edward St Vincent Digby, 9th Baron Digby (21 June 1809 – 16 October 1889), also 3rd Baron Digby in the Peerage of Great Britain, was a British peer.

Biography
Digby was the son of Admiral Sir Henry Digby, who fought at the Battle of Trafalgar, and Lady Jane Elizabeth Coke, daughter of Thomas Coke, 1st Earl of Leicester. Jane Digby was his sister. He was commissioned a captain in the Dorsetshire Yeomanry on 12 November 1848. On 12 May 1856 he succeeded as ninth Baron Digby (in the Peerage of Ireland) and third Baron Digby (in the Peerage of Great Britain) on the death of his first cousin once removed, Edward Digby, 2nd Earl Digby (on whose death the earldom became extinct), and was able to take a seat in the House of Lords. On 26 July 1856, he was promoted to lieutenant-colonel in the Yeomanry, and on 19 July 1866, succeeded Lord Rivers as lieutenant-colonel commandant of the regiment. He resigned the command in 1870. Lord Digby died suddenly on 16 October 1889 at his home, Minterne House in Dorset of a stroke, he was later buried in St. Andrew's Church, Minterne.

Personal life
Lord Digby married his third cousin Lady Theresa Anna Maria Fox-Strangways, daughter of Henry Fox-Strangways, 3rd Earl of Ilchester, in 1837. He died in October 1889, aged 80, and was succeeded in his titles by his eldest son Edward Henry Trafalgar Digby. Lord Digby's great-granddaughter was the Hon. Pamela Digby, American Ambassador to France. Lord Digby and Lady Theresa Fox-Strangways had three daughters and four sons:

Hon. Victoria Alexandrina Digby, born 1840, died 21 May 1917, married Richard Marker, eldest son of Reverend Thomas John Marker and Frances Drewe
Hon. Leonora Caroline Digby, born 8 November 1844, died 19 August 1930, married Alexander Baring, 4th Baron Ashburton
Edward Henry Trafalgar Digby, 10th Baron Digby, born 21 October 1846, died 11 May 1920, married Emily Hood, daughter of the Hon. Albert Hood second son of Samuel Hood-Tibbits, 3rd Viscount Hood
Hon. Mary-Theresa Digby, born 3 January 1848, died 12 October 1896, married Major William Charles James, younger son of Colonel Sir Philip James of Dorset and Susan Georgiana Ryder, daughter of the Hon. Granville Dudley Ryder
Hon. Almarus Kenelm Digby, born 5 September 1850, died 13 December 1886 of Typhoid Fever unmarried
Colonel Hon. Everard Charles Digby, born 6 September 1852, died 16 January 1915, married Lady Emily FitzMaurice, daughter of Henry Petty-FitzMaurice, 4th Marquess of Lansdowne
Captain Hon. Gerald FitzMaurice Digby, born 20 December 1858, died 8 December 1942, married Lady Lillian Liddell, daughter of Henry Liddell, 2nd Earl of Ravensworth

Ancestry

Coat of Arms

Notes

References
Kidd, Charles, Williamson, David (editors). Debrett's Peerage and Baronetage (1990 edition). New York: St Martin's Press, 1990.

1809 births
1889 deaths
Queen's Own Dorset Yeomanry officers
Edward
Edward 09
Edward 09